Danny Bampton (born 6 March 1980) is an Australian former professional rugby league footballer who played in the 1990s and 2000s for the Brisbane Broncos in the Australian National Rugby League competition.

References

External links
Danny Bampton at The Rugby League Project
Danny Bampton at Yesterday's Heroes

Rugby league players from Brisbane
1980 births
Rugby league centres
Brisbane Broncos players
Living people